"Ghetto Heaven" is a song by American soul and R&B group The Family Stand, released in 1990 as their debut single, from their second album, Chain (1989). It features vocals by lead-singer Sandra St. Victor and was an international hit, peaking at number ten in the UK in April 1990. Eight years later, in January 1998, the song again charted on the UK Singles Chart, peaking at number 30. Additionally, it was a top 10 hit in Luxembourg and a top 20 hit in New Zealand. A music video was produced to promote the single, featuring the group performing in an urban city setting. American band Lisa Lisa and Cult Jam sampled it on their 1991 hit, "Let the Beat Hit 'Em".

Chart performance
"Ghetto Heaven" charted in several countries, in both Europe and Oceania. In Luxembourg, it peaked at number nine in its second week on the Radio Luxembourg singles chart in April 1990, after debuting at number 19. It then dropped to number 15, 17, 16, 14 and 16. In the Netherlands, it reached number 23 on Dutch Top 40, while reaching number 22 on the Single Top 100. In New Zealand, the song charted for eight weeks at the Recorded Music NZ singles chart, peaking at number 20 in its first week, on July 1, 1990. 

In the UK, "Ghetto Heaven" debuted at number 24 on the UK Singles Chart on March 25. It climbed to number 13, staying there for two weeks, then climbing to number 12, before peaking at number ten on April 22. It stayed at that position for two weeks, before dropping to number 12, 17, 19, 37 and 57. On the Eurochart Hot 100, the single reached its highest position as number 24 on May 12, 1990.

Critical reception
Andrew Hamilton from AllMusic commented, "The much ballyhooed "Ghetto Heaven" attempts to capture the power of Marvin Gaye and Curtis Mayfield in social significancy but has the impact of a mosquitoe." Bill Coleman from Billboard stated that "this multitalented outfit stands to win on its own terms this time out with an aggressively funky R&B track of considerable merit." He also declared it as "brilliant", and "music with a message" with a groove enhanced by mixes by Jazzie B & Nellee Hooper of Soul II Soul. 

Greg Sandow from Entertainment Weekly viewed it as "a look at how people use love, liquor, and religion to escape the troubles of life". A reviewer from Music & Media wrote, "A hip-hop number with a classic soul vocal. Soul II Soul meets early 70s Tamla Motown with a hint of Chaka Khan. Highly recommended." British magazine Music Week ranked the song number five in their Top 10 list, Pick Of The Year - Dance. Carol Irving from Smash Hits complimented it as "a brooding, deeply groovy work of genius" and "so brilliant". Mitch Potter from Toronto Star remarked the "percolating funk" of "Ghetto Heaven", "a portrait of oppressive street life that describes three escape routes (drugs, love, religion)".

Track listing
 7" single, UK
"Ghetto Heaven" (Remix Edit)
"Ghetto Heaven" (Original Version)

 12" single, Europe
"Ghetto Heaven" (Remix) – 4:55
"Ghetto Heaven" (Original Version) – 4:00
"Ghetto Heaven" (Original Version) – 4:51

 CD maxi, Europe
"Ghetto Heaven" (The Remix) – 4:50
"Ghetto Heaven" (The Dub) – 4:50
"Ghetto Heaven" (The Original) – 3:56

Charts

References

1990 songs
1990 debut singles
1998 singles
Atlantic Records singles
Acid jazz songs
Soul songs